Styx River is in the north of the Canterbury region of New Zealand.

References

Rivers of Canterbury, New Zealand
Rivers of New Zealand